The Bell Witch is a folk legend from the American south.

Bell Witch may also refer to:

Film
 Bell Witch: The Movie, a 2007 horror film
 The Bell Witch Haunting, a 2013 horror film

Music
 Bell Witch (band), an American doom metal band from Seattle, Washington,
 The Bell Witch (EP), by Mercyful Fate